Haldia Refinery is an oil refinery operated by Indian Oil Corporation, located in Haldia city in the state of West Bengal. This refinery has a capacity of 8 million tonnes per year. For processing 2.5 MMTPA of Middle East crude, two sectors were commissioned in January 1975 - one for producing fuel products and the other for Lube base stocks.
The fuel sector was built with French collaboration and the Lube sector with Romanian collaboration. The refining capacity of the Refinery was increased to 2.75 million tonnes per year in 1989 through debottlenecking measures. This refinery can produce fuel products like LPG, Naphtha, Motor Spirit, Mineral Turpentine Oil, Superior Kerosene, Aviation Turbine Fuel, High Speed Diesel, Jute Batching Oil.

References

External links
 Haldia Refinery
 IndianOil Refining

Oil refineries in India
Indian Oil Corporation
Energy in West Bengal
Haldia
Indian Oil Corporation buildings and structures
1975 establishments in West Bengal
Energy infrastructure completed in 1975
20th-century architecture in India